Víctor Mongil Adeva (born 21 July 1992) is a Spanish professional footballer who plays as a centre-back for Indian Super League club Kerala Blasters.

Club career
Born in Valladolid, Castile and León, Mongil started his senior career with local club Real Valladolid's reserves in Tercera División. He went on to make nine competitive appearances for the first team, his Segunda División debut coming on 17 September 2011 in a 3–1 home loss against Real Murcia where he played 90 minutes.

For the better part of the next seven seasons, Mongil competed in the Segunda División B, representing Atlético Madrid B, CD Alcoyano, Mérida AD, Pontevedra CF and Atlético Levante UD (with the latter side, he also spent six months in the fourth tier). On 29 January 2019 he moved to the Georgian Erovnuli Liga, signing with FC Dinamo Tbilisi and playing five matches in the 2019–20 UEFA Europa League before being ousted by Feyenoord in the last qualifying round.

On 2 January 2020, Mongil joined ATK of the Indian Super League. He returned to Dinamo shortly after, winning another Erovnuli Liga.

Mongil returned to India and its top tier on 26 July 2021, agreeing to a contract at Odisha FC. One year later, he moved to Kerala Blasters FC of the same league. He made his debut on 7 October, as a last-minute substitute in a 3–1 win against East Bengal Club.

Career statistics

Honours
Dinamo Tbilisi
Erovnuli Liga: 2019, 2020

ATK
Indian Super League: 2019–20

References

External links

1992 births
Living people
Spanish footballers
Footballers from Valladolid
Association football defenders
Segunda División players
Segunda División B players
Tercera División players
Real Valladolid Promesas players
Real Valladolid players
Atlético Madrid B players
CD Alcoyano footballers
Mérida AD players
Pontevedra CF footballers
Atlético Levante UD players
Erovnuli Liga players
FC Dinamo Tbilisi players
Indian Super League players
ATK (football club) players
Odisha FC players
Kerala Blasters FC players
Spain youth international footballers
Spanish expatriate footballers
Expatriate footballers in Georgia (country)
Expatriate footballers in India
Spanish expatriate sportspeople in Georgia (country)
Spanish expatriate sportspeople in India